Kamdark (also Romanized as Kamdārk; also known as Kamdārag) is a village in Jakdan Rural District, in the Central District of Bashagard County, Hormozgan Province, Iran. At the 2006 census, its population was 301, in 68 families.

References 

Populated places in Bashagard County